Davos is the debut studio album of Danielle "Danz" Johnson and released under the moniker Computer Magic. It was released on October 16, 2015 on her label Channel 9 Records and on P-Vine and Tugboat in Japan.

Background and recording 
Johnson wrote all songs on Davos, except "All Day" which is credited to her, Brian Hancock III, Brian Robertson. The album has been recorded at Atomic Heart Studios (New York, NY), except "All Day" at 10K Islands Studios (Florida, MI), and "Hudson" at Channel 9 Studios (New York City, NY), Rubber Tracks Studios (New York, NY), Xander Singh's Studios (Los Angeles, CA). Most of the album's tracks were produced, mixed and engineered by Claudius Mittendorfer. Steve Fallone is credited with mastering at Sterling Sound (New York, NY), and Chad Kamenshine with the artwork.

Chris Egan III, Ignacio Rivas Bixio, John Hancock III played percussion and Tim Wheeler of Ash, Brian Robertson, Andrew Wilder played guitar. On the album there were used instruments such as Minimoog, Omnichord, live drums and guitar.

Promotion and release 
The title Davos is a homage to a now-decrepit ski resort where Johnson grew up in upstate New York, where her father worked and still resides, although the ski resort closed when Johnson was 3 years old.

Before the album's release, The New Yorker mentioned Davos in a This Week article. 3 music videos were released to promote this album: "Be Fair" (filmed in Trona Pinnacles), "Hudson", and "Fuzz".

Reception 
Stereogum premiered the first single "Be Fair" and described it as "one lusty synthpop hook after another". They also premiered the single "Fuzz" and described it as "pulsating, funky '80s synth lines hold down the low end beneath clean, bright melodies that complement her vocals throughout the chorus". According to the synthpop site The Electricity Club, songs like "Fuzz" and "Give Me Just a Minute" "recalled the early adventures of Ladytron, while "Hudson" hinted more at the leanings of Dubstar".

Track listing

Personnel 
 Danielle Johnson - vocals (all tracks), songwriting (all tracks), production (track 6)
 Claudius Mittendorfer - production (tracks 1-5, 7, 9-12), mixing (tracks 1-7, 9-12), engineering (tracks 1-5, 7, 9-12)
 Brian Robertson - guitar, production (track 8), mixing (track 8), engineering (track 8)
 Brian Hancock III - percussion, production (track 8), mixing (track 8), engineering (track 8)
 Jason Finkel - production (track 6), engineering (track 6)
 Xander Singh - production (track 6), engineering (track 6)
 Tim Wheeler - guitar
 Andrew Wilder - guitar
 Chris Egan III - percussion
 Ignacio Rivas Bixio - percussion
 Steve Fallone - mastering at Sterling Sound in New York, NY
 Chad Kamenshine - artwork

References 

2015 albums
Danz CM albums